The Cágado River is a river of Sergipe state in northeastern Brazil. it is one of the main affluents of the Sergipe River, from its left margin.

See also
List of rivers of Sergipe

References
Brazilian Ministry of Transport

Rivers of Sergipe